Thomas Schönlebe (born 6 August 1965) is a retired East German track and field athlete who competed in the 400 metres. He won the gold medal at the 1987 World Championships. In that race, he set a European record of 44.33 seconds which still stands.

A year earlier, Schönlebe had finished second at the 1986 European Championships in Stuttgart behind Roger Black. One of his last achievements was the third place at the 1993 World Championships in Stuttgart with the (now unified) German 4 × 400 m relay team.

Schönlebe achieved three world indoor records during his career

 45.41 s in the 400 m on 9 February 1986;
 45.05 s in 400 m on 5 February 1988;
 3:03.05 in 4x400 m relay as a member of a German team on 10 March 1991.
Note: Schönlebe's first record has the distinction of being the inaugural record at the distance when the IAAF established the category of world indoor records on January 1, 1987.

Schönlebe later became chief executive officer of his hometown club, LAC Erdgas Chemnitz 

In 1994, he was awarded the Rudolf Harbig Memorial Award.

International competitions

Note: Schönlebe qualified for the 1988 European Indoor final but withdrew.

World rankings 

Schonlebe was ranked among the best in the world at the 400 m sprint events in the period 1983–87 (including world number one in 1987), according to the votes of the experts of Track and Field News.

See also
List of European Athletics Championships medalists (men)

References

1965 births
Living people
People from Frauenstein, Saxony
German male sprinters
East German male sprinters
Olympic athletes of East Germany
Athletes (track and field) at the 1988 Summer Olympics
Olympic athletes of Germany
Athletes (track and field) at the 1992 Summer Olympics
Athletes (track and field) at the 1996 Summer Olympics
World Athletics Championships athletes for Germany
World Athletics Championships athletes for East Germany
World Athletics Championships medalists
European Athletics Championships medalists
World Athletics Indoor Championships winners
World Athletics Championships winners
Friendship Games medalists in athletics
Sportspeople from Saxony